Pradeep E Ragav is an Indian film editor, who works predominantly in the Tamil film industry.

Career 
After graduating with a degree in Visual Communication from DG Vaishnav College, Chennai. Pradeep worked as an assistant editor to Praveen K. L. from 2012 to 2016. He made his first debut as an editor in Tamil film Kathakali (film) in 2016. Pradeep got his major breakthrough in a science-fiction film Tik Tik Tik (2018 film). After Tik Tik Tik, Pradeep went on to edit many blockbuster films such as Comali and many more.

Filmography

References

External links
 
 

Living people
Tamil film editors
People from Chennai district
1991 births
Film editors from Tamil Nadu